Comme dans l'espace is a Canadian French-language children's television program for youth aged 9 – 12. The series explores Astronomy and the Cosmos. In each episode, a new space-related concept is presented using experiments, expert information, and the resources of an android that uses artificial intelligence. The series is co-produced by Botsford Media and Connections Productions.

Season 1 of the series was first aired on the television channel Unis TV on 2 March 2021.

Plot
Comme dans l’espace is fiction-based and tells the story of two adolescents, Alex and Joaquim.  These two vloggers discover a former secret space agency station (the bunker).  With the assistance of an android, Mia, an apprentice astronaut, data from the Canadian Space Agency and various experiments, they explore the phenomena of the science of space.

In each episode, Alex and Joaquim are assigned a new mission from Frédéric Gallant, an apprentice astronaut. Each mission explores a new space-related subject such as black holes, weightlessness and the movement of the planets.  Their objective is to learn about the science of the cosmos all the while conducting experiments on Earth.  They vlog these experiments and share their experiences with their viewing public.

The location of the bunker is unknown to the public and no-one other than Frédéric and Mia know they are using the bunker to do their vlog.  They have several close-calls with the information support technician and a few false alarms to add to their challenge.

The concept of this television series, Comme dans l'espace, is to provide an educational experience for the young, but in effect, it is a show for all ages.

Production

Cast
This table presents the principal actors in Season 1.

Characters
 Alex

An adventurer passionate about exploring space.  Curious and full of life, she is overflowing with energy and will stop at nothing.  She wants to see everything and live each adventure to the fullest.  Joaquim's best friend, she tries everything she can to get him to do things or experiment when he would never dare to do it on his own. She represents the story and experience of the exploration of space.

Joaquim

With a lifelong passion about space, Joaquim is a quiet storm. When he finally decides to embark on an adventure, he goes all out and even surprises himself. He is curious, knowledgeable, and also wants to convey his passion for space, but he has a nervous temperament all the same, and he is often reluctant to embark on an adventure. He embodies the humor and the human side of the series.

 Mia

The android of the secret bunker of the Canadian Space Agency has access to all of the Agency's records, and she's always one question away from the answer. She is a one-dimensional character, who has no human references other than the ones she has in her database. She has no humour and takes things at face value, but she is always ready to give definitions, information or to correct certain information, at any time, even if it is not the time. An endless source of information, Mia can project images wherever she wants, and control the entire bunker.

 Frédéric Gallant
An aspiring young astronaut from the Canadian Space Agency, Frédéric patiently awaits the day he is sent on a mission to space. He is the key to the bunker and the bridge between it and the Agency. Seeing in Joaquim and Alex his own passion for space, Frédéric allows them to enter and exit the Agency bunker as they see fit, but in secret. Plus, through Mia and the bunker screens, he provides our vloggers with all the information they need to fuel their adventures.

 Tortue

A nickname given by Alex and Joaquim, Tortue, the IT support technician is a constant source of stress for our two vloggers. Part security guard, archivist, IT support technician, janitor and more, Tortue is never happy to come and inspect the bunker, but on the orders of the Agency, he does come more often than he would like. He does not know that our two young people are taking refuge there, and we always have the impression that he will surprise them. He is often about to discover Alex or Joaquim's presence, but he is not skillful enough to see them. Without knowing it, he provides material for the adventures of our two animators.

Guests

Episodes

Season 1 (2021)

Production Crew
 Title : Comme dans l'espace
 Director : Christian Essiambre
 Writers : Christian Essiambre, Jean-Sébastien Lévesque, Marijo Meunier, Luckas Cardona Morisset, Micheline Sylvestre
 Director of Photography : Blake Stilwell
 Sound Engineer : Paul Goguen
 Lighting : Blake Stilwell
 Editors : Eric Leclerc, Robert Sharpe
 Producers : Marcel Gallant, Gilles Doiron, Chris Goguen, Marc Savoie
 Production Companies : Connections Productions, Botsford Media
 Broadcaster : Unis TV
 Country of origin : Canada
 Original language : French
 Format : colour
 Genre : Children's television series
 Length : 30 minutes (with commercials) about 24 minutes  (without commercials)
 Film locations : Quebec, New Brunswick, Nova Scotia

Filming
Filming for this series took place in Québec, New Brunswick and Nova Scotia, Canada.

A studio was built in Shediac, New Brunswick to simulate an old secret space station or bunker. A large part of the story of the production takes place in this 'bunker'.

References

External links
 Official website - Comme dans l'espace
 IMDb: Comme dans l'espace
 Yannick Bergeron website

2020s Canadian children's television series
2021 Canadian television series debuts
Acadian culture in New Brunswick
French-language television shows
Shediac
Canadian children's education television series
Television series about teenagers
Television shows filmed in Halifax, Nova Scotia
Television shows filmed in New Brunswick